Accia may refer to:
 Accia (gens), a Roman gens
 Diocese of Accia, on Corsica, disestablished 1544
 Plukenetia (syn. Accia), a genus of plant of the family Euphorbiaceae